Sayed Rahman Hashemi (رحمان هاشمى) is an Afghan politician. He serves as the chairman of Kabul's Provincial Council since 2014.

References 

Living people
1988 births
21st-century Afghan politicians